The Indian Islamic Center, Abu Dhabi (In Arabic: المقر الهندي الإسلامي -  أبو ظبي) is a socio-cultural and religious centre for the Indian community that resides in Abu Dhabi.

The chief patron of the centre is chaired by the business tycoon M. A. Yusuff Ali. P Bava Haji, Dr Abdurahman Moulavi Olavattur, Karappath Usman, Abdul Kareem Haji, Abdul Salam are some of the committee members who manage the centre.

The centre registered with the Ministry of Social Affairs. It hosts more than five hundred active members.

History
The Islamic Centre was established in 1971 by social and philanthropic activists from Kerala who regularly assembled at Chithari Compound, a bachelor accommodation.

The center's new building was inaugurated by President of India Pratibha Patil on 23 November 2010 during her official visit.

In 2014, the centre celebrated its 40th anniversary with activities in UAE and India.

Bava Haji is the centre's longest-serving president. He played a key role in opening Al Noor Indian Islamic School under the Islamic Centre for the poor and economically backward. The school closed in 2014.

References

1971 establishments in the United Arab Emirates
Organizations established in 1971
Organisations based in Abu Dhabi
Buildings and structures in Abu Dhabi
Islamic organisations based in the United Arab Emirates
Indian diaspora in the United Arab Emirates